Nora Marie Tschirner (born 12 June 1981) is a German film actress, musician and former television and radio presenter.

Early life

Nora Tschirner was born in East Berlin (then East Germany) to the documentary film director  and the radio journalist Waltraud Tschirner. She grew up with her two older brothers in the East Berlin suburb Pankow. She attended John-Lennon-Gymnasium in Berlin, as did Sarah Kuttner, with whom she is friends. Tschirner completed her Abitur at the Rosa-Luxemburg-Oberschule in Pankow. She made her first appearance on television in 1997 with a role in the ZDF children's series Achterbahn.

Presenting

In 2001, she was cast as a VJ for MTV and worked for the station until 2007. In addition, she hosted the radio program "Blue Moon" on Radio Fritz (RBB) with Stephan Michme. In 2004 she appeared with Christian Ulmen in his show Ulmens Auftrag on MTV. In 2007 she hosted the First Steps Awards. She was also seen in OneRepublic's Secrets music video as the main character.

Acting

After appearing as Anya in Conny Walter's  (2001), she was the leading actress, playing Paula Behringer, in the ARD series Sternenfänger (2002). In 2003 she played alongside Matthias Schweighöfer as Katharina in Soloalbum, from the novel with the same title by Benjamin von Stuckrad-Barre. In 2005 she was the leading actress, playing Titzi in Anno Saul's Kebab Connection and some smaller roles in television series including Ein starkes Team and Abschnitt 40. She was the leading actress playing alongside Christian Ulmen in the film . In 2006 she played in the ZDF science fiction series Ijon Tichy: Raumpilot, a filming of The Star Diaries by Stanisław Lem. It won the German Television Prize and was nominated for the Grimme-Preis. In 2007 she was the leading actress alongside Til Schweiger in the romantic comedy Keinohrhasen. For this role, she won a Bambi in the national film category in 2008. From 2013, Tschirner and Christian Ulmen play a team – and couple – of investigators in the Weimar-based episodes of the Tatort crime film series. In the German version of the 2013 reboot of the video game Tomb Raider, she voices the main character Lara Croft.

Singing

She participated on the songs "Das ewige Date" and "Küss mich schnell bevor Du platzt" on the album Brichst du mir das Herz, dann brech ich dir die Beine by Olli Schulz und der Hund Marie. In 2012 Nora Tschirner together with Tom Krimi and Erik Lautenschläger founded the band project "Prag". They released the "cineastic pop" album "Premiere".

Filmography

Television

 2002: Sternenfänger (series)
 2004: Ein starkes Team: Sicherheitsstufe 1
 2004: Ulmens Auftrag
 2005: Nichts geht mehr (13th Street Shocking Short)
 2006: Die ProSieben Märchenstunde, Hans im Glück as apprentice witch 'Rabea'
 2007 & 2011: Ijon Tichy: Raumpilot  (Comedy science fiction series)
 2007: Das letzte Stück Himmel
 2013: Tatort: 
 2015: Tatort: Der irre Iwan
 2016:  Tatort: 
 2016: Circus Halligalli
 2017: Tatort: Der scheidende Schupo
 2017: jerks.: Braindead
 2017: Tatort: Der wüste Gobi
 2018: Tatort: Der kalte Fritte
 2018: Tatort: 
 2019: Arthurs Gesetz (series)
 2019: Tatort: Der höllische Heinz

Cinema

 2001: 
 2003: Soloalbum
 2005: Kebab Connection
 2006: 
 2006: The Conclave
 2007: Rabbits Without Ears
 2008: 
 2009: 
 2009: Vicky the Viking
 2009: Mord ist mein Geschäft, Liebling
 2009: Rabbit Without Ears 2
 2010: 
 2010: Hier kommt Lola!
 2010: Bon Appétit
 2011: 
 2012: 
 2013: Everyone's Going to Die
 2013: Girl on a Bicycle
 2014: 
 2016: SMS für Dich
 2022:  (also creative producer)
 2022:

Video games

 2013: Tomb Raider (German voice of Lara Croft)
 2019: Trüberbrook

Audiobooks 
 2013: Amy Silver: Du und ich und all die Jahre, publisher: Random House Audio, 
 2015: Elizabeth Little: Mördermädchen (Dear Daughter, together with Oliver Siebeck), publisher: der Hörverlag,

Awards
 2008: Bambi - film national for the performance in Keinohrhasen
 2009: Jupiter - best actress (national) for the performance in Keinohrhasen
 2010: GQ Woman Of The Year Award

External links

 
Nora Tschirner at the German Dubbing Card Index

References

1981 births
Living people
German film actresses
People from East Berlin
German radio presenters
German women radio presenters
German television presenters
Actresses from Berlin
Singers from Berlin
German television actresses
German video game actresses
German voice actresses
21st-century German actresses
21st-century German women singers
German women television presenters
People from Pankow